Luv' Hitpack is the seventeenth single by the Dutch girl group Luv' released in 1989 by Mercury/Phonogram Records and is a Megamix conceived by Peter Slaghuis. It appears on the compilation Greatest Hits. The long version of this medley is included as a bonus track on the Box set Completely In Luv'.

Song history
Marga Scheide accompanied by two vocalists Diana van Berlo and Michelle Gold reformed Luv' in 1989 and promoted new material released by the Dutch label Dureco/High Fahion Music. Meanwhile, the group's first record company Philips Records/Phonogram Records and its sister label (Mercury Records) decided to repackage Luv's old repertoire. That's why a "Greatest Hits" album came out, including successful hit singles, album songs and a bonus track: Luv' Hitpack, a megamix conceived by the Dutch DJ-remixer-producer Peter Slaghuis. Slaghuis is known for the 1985 hit Woodpeckers from Space by Video Kids, the 1988 hit Jack To the Sound of the Underground by Hithouse and the numerous remixes he did for world-famous acts: Nu Shooz, Madonna, Petula Clark, Technotronic, Mel & Kim...The strategy of Mercury Records to release this medley was inspired by the example of Boney M. whose megamix and remixes entered the European charts.

Commercial performance

Luv' Hitpack didn't enter any record chart due to a lack of promotion by Luv'.

Track listings and formats
Luv' Hitpack came out in three formats.

 7" Vinyl Single
"Luv' Hitpack" (Single Version) — 4:32
Casanova/Life Is On My Side/U.O.Me/Casanova/You're The Greatest Lover/Life Is On My Side/Trojan Horse/Everybody's Shakin' Hands On Broadway/Casanova
"Luv' Stuff"  — 3:18

12" Vinyl Single
"Luv' Hitpack"	(Long version) - 5:28
"Luv' Stuff" -	4:50

CD Single
"Luv' Hitpack" (Single Version) — 4:32
Casanova/Life Is On My Side/U.O.Me/Casanova/You're The Greatest Lover/Life Is On My Side/Trojan Horse/Everybody's Shakin' Hands On Broadway/Casanova
"Luv' Hitpack" (Long Version) — 5:29
Casanova/Life Is On My Side/U.O.Me/Casanova/You're The Greatest Lover/Life Is On My Side/Trojan Horse/Everybody's Shakin' Hands On Broadway/Casanova
"Luv' Stuff"  — 3:18

References

1989 singles
Luv' songs
Songs written by Hans van Hemert
Songs written by Piet Souer
1989 songs
Phonogram Records singles
Mercury Records singles